General elections were held in Malawi on 21 May 2019 to elect the President, National Assembly and local government councillors. Incumbent President Peter Mutharika of the Democratic Progressive Party was re-elected, with his party remaining the largest in the National Assembly. However, on 3 February 2020, the Constitutional Court annulled the presidential election results due to evidence of irregularities, and ordered fresh elections be held. They were widely dubbed the "Tipp-Ex elections" after a brand of correction fluid which opponents claimed had been used to tamper with votes.

Electoral system
The President of Malawi is elected using the first-past-the-post system; the candidate that receives the most votes is the winner of the election. The 193 members of the National Assembly are also elected by first-past-the-post voting in single-member constituencies.

Presidential candidates
A total of ten candidates registered to contest the elections. Incumbent President Peter Mutharika of the Democratic Progressive Party (DPP) ran for a second term in office. Vice-President Saulos Chilima also contested the election as the United Transformation Movement (UTM) candidate, having left the DPP in 2018. The other candidates included Lazarus Chakwera (Malawi Congress Party) and Atupele Muluzi (United Democratic Front).

Former president Joyce Banda (People's Party) had originally planned to run for the presidency, but withdrew her candidacy two months before the election; she later endorsed opposition candidate Lazarus Chakwera. Ras Chikomeni Chirwa was disqualified due to lack of funds and failing to collect enough signatures.

Results

President

National Assembly

Aftermath

The results of the 2019 elections were highly controversial and opposition leaders led by Lazarus Chakwera and Saulos Chilima disputed the results in court. Nationwide protests were held in May, June, and July 2019 in which supporters of the opposition accused the results of being rigged by Mutharika and Jane Ansah, chairperson of the Malawi Electoral Commission, calling for Ansah’s resignation. Malawian youth organised a "Jane Ansah Must Fall" campaign, which included days of protests in several cities. In response, thousands of women in Malawi held "I am Jane Ansah" solidarity protests after alleging that Ansah was the victim of gender discrimination.

On 3 February 2020, the Constitutional Court judges arrived in Lilongwe to read the disputed presidential election results judgement after travelling in a military vehicle with a heavy police escort. The judges took turns to read the 500-page decision over more than seven hours. The ruling nullified the results of the presidential election, concluding they had not met the standards of a free and fair election and that the Malawi Electoral Commission had failed to uphold its constitutional responsibilities. The judgement cited tampering of results, failure to address complaints raised by opposition candidates, and numerous other malpractices. The ruling also called into question the use of a plurality system in the presidential elections, stating the Malawi Constitution requires a majority of votes.

Mutharika was declared not duly elected and thus no longer President. The judges ordered fresh elections be held within 150 days.

Although DPP won a plurality of seats, elections in three of the seats it won were annulled due to irregularities, and thus they were reduced to 59 lawmakers in the Parliament.

References

Malawi
General
Elections in Malawi
Malawi
Presidential elections in Malawi
Election and referendum articles with incomplete results
Annulled elections